Encino is a village in Torrance County, New Mexico, United States. The population was 82 at the 2010 census. It is part of the Albuquerque Metropolitan Statistical Area.

Geography
Encino is located at  (34.651474, -105.462597).

Demographics

As of the census of 2000, there were 94 people, 43 households, and 27 families residing in the village. The population density was 47.2 people per square mile (18.2/km2). There were 70 housing units at an average density of 35.2 per square mile (13.6/km2). The racial makeup of the village was 56.38% White, 42.55% from other races, and 1.06% from two or more races. Hispanic or Latino of any race were 80.85% of the population.

There were 43 households, out of which 30.2% had children under the age of 18 living with them, 53.5% were married couples living together, 9.3% had a female householder with no husband present, and 34.9% were non-families. 27.9% of all households were made up of individuals, and 16.3% had someone living alone who was 65 years of age or older. The average household size was 2.19 and the average family size was 2.68.

In the village, the population was spread out, with 17.0% under the age of 18, 4.3% from 18 to 24, 25.5% from 25 to 44, 31.9% from 45 to 64, and 21.3% who were 65 years of age or older. The median age was 46 years. For every 100 females, there were 108.9 males. For every 100 females age 18 and over there were 105.3 males.

The median income for a household in the village was $22,679, and the median income for a family was $28,250. Males had a median income of $29,375 versus $22,083 for females. The per capita income for the village was $12,191. 2.2% of the population lives below the poverty line, including no families or anyone under 18 or over 64.

Education
Vaughn Municipal Schools is the local school district.

References

Villages in Torrance County, New Mexico
Villages in New Mexico
Albuquerque metropolitan area